Paeon or Paion was an ancient Greek city located in ancient Thrace, on the west coast of the Thracian Chersonesus. It is cited in the Periplus of Pseudo-Scylax, in the third position of its recitation of the towns of the Thracian Chersonesus, along with Cardia, Ide, Paeon, Alopeconnesus, Araplus, Elaeus and Sestos.

Its site is tentatively located near Ece Liman, Çanakkale Province, Turkey.

See also
Greek colonies in Thrace

References

Populated places in ancient Thrace
Former populated places in Turkey
Greek colonies in the Thracian Chersonese
History of Çanakkale Province